The Swedish Chemical Society was established in 1883 and is a nonprofit organisation to promote the development of chemistry in Sweden.
The society is based on Wallingatan, Stockholm.
 is the monthly magazine of the Swedish Chemical Society.

References 

Learned societies of Sweden
Chemistry societies
Scientific organizations established in 1883
1883 establishments in Sweden